Doncaster is divided into and across three parliamentary constituencies.

History

From the 1885 general election to the 1983 general election, Doncaster was represented by the sole Doncaster constituency. From 1997 to 2010, it was divided into 4 constituencies, with the Barnsley East and Mexborough constituency consisting of wards in Barnsley and the Mexborough area. This constituency was abolished for the 2010 general election and the Mexborough area was added to the Doncaster North constituency.

Party representation since 1950

Doncaster